Darling Dear is the first EP from the Oxford, UK alternative rock band Little Fish. It was released on 9 October 2009

The track "Darling Dear" is featured as downloadable content in Rock Band.

Track listing

Personnel
 Julia "Juju" Sophie: vocals, lead guitar
 Neil "Nez" Greenaway: drums

References

External links

Custard Records albums
2009 debut EPs
Little Fish (band) albums